Sui County or Suixian is a county located in northern Hubei province, People's Republic of China, bordering Henan province to the north. It is under the administration of Suizhou City and was established in May 2009. It was the location of the minor state of Li during the Warring States period, and was conquered by Chu at some point.

Administrative divisions

Nineteen towns:
Lishan, Gaocheng, Yindian, Caodian, Xiaolin, Huaihe, Wanhe, Shangshi, Tangxian, Wushan, Xinjie, Anju, Huantan (sometimes written as ), Hongshan, Changgang, Sanligang, Liulin, Junchuan, Wanfudian (formerly Wanfu)

References 

 
Counties of Hubei
Suizhou